Austria is a nation that has competed at the Hopman Cup tournament on five occasions. It first competed at the 2nd annual staging in 1990 and its best result to date came in 1994, when it reached the semifinals.

Players
This is a list of players who have played for Austria in the Hopman Cup.

Results

References

Hopman Cup teams
Hopman Cup
Hopman Cup